Letham is a small former mining village in Falkirk district, Scotland.  It is located less than 2 miles from the town of Airth.

References

External links

Canmore - Letham Cottages site record

Villages in Falkirk (council area)